There are two acts known as the War Crimes Act
War Crimes Act 1991 of the United Kingdom
War Crimes Act of 1996 of the United States

See also
Crimes Against Humanity and War Crimes Act of Canada